People awarded the Honorary citizenship of the City of Baltimore, Maryland, United States of America are:

Honorary Citizens of Baltimore
Listed by date of award:

References

Baltimore
Baltimore
Baltimore-related lists
Honorary citizens of Baltimore